The 45th Surgical Hospital was a United States military hospital that saw service in the China-Burma-India theater in World War II, Korea, and Vietnam.

Lineage
Activated 7 June 1943 at Camp White, Oregon as the 45th Portable Surgical Hospital
Inactivated 1945
Activated 1953 in Korea
Inactivated 1954
Activated 1956 at Fort Sam Houston Texas
Inactivated in the Republic of Vietnam, 10 December 1970

Honors

Campaign participation credit
 World War II
India-Burma
China Defensive
Central Burma
China Offensive
 Korean War
Third Winter Campaign
Summer-Fall 1953
 Vietnam

Decorations
Meritorious Unit Citation (Army)

VIETNAM 1966-1969

Distinctive Unit Insignia

Description
A silver color metal and enamel device 1 1/4 inches (3.18 cm) in height overall consisting of a black Chinthe astride a silver cross issuing from a Taeguk between two maroon fleams. All in front and below a stylized palm branch with two oak leaves proper.

Symbolism
Maroon and white are the colors used for the Medical Department. The Chinthe or Burmese griffin, taken from the seal of Burma, refers to the Hospital's service in that area during World War II. The Taeguk alludes to the Hospital's service in Korea and together with the two fleams (a heraldic surgical instrument used in early medicine) represents the two campaigns in Korea. The fleams and cross further symbolize the basic mission of the Surgical Hospital. The palm symbolizes long life and the oak leaves strength and bravery.

Background

The distinctive unit insignia was approved on 3 September 1969.

Korean War

Vietnam 
The main body of the 45th arrived at Vung Tau, Vietnam on 4 October 1966. On 4 November 1966, the 45th's commanding officer, Major Gary P. Wratten, was killed during a mortar attack.

See also 
List of former United States Army medical units
Mobile Army Surgical Hospital
Combat Support Hospital

References

External links
Theobald, Paul. About the 45th Portable Surgical Hospital 1943. Retrieved 1 March 2007.

Military units and formations of the United States Army in the Vietnam War
United States military hospitals
Hospitals established in 1943
Military units and formations established in 1943
Military units and formations disestablished in 1970
Medical units and formations of the United States Army